The Arctic Council is a high-level intergovernmental forum that addresses issues faced by the Arctic governments and the indigenous people of the Arctic. At present, eight countries exercise sovereignty over the lands within the Arctic Circle, and these constitute the member states of the council: Canada; Denmark; Finland; Iceland; Norway; Russia; Sweden; and the United States. Other countries or national groups can be admitted as observer states, while organizations representing the concerns of indigenous peoples can be admitted as indigenous permanent participants.

History
The first step towards the formation of the Council occurred in 1991 when the eight Arctic countries signed the Arctic Environmental Protection Strategy (AEPS). The 1996 Ottawa Declaration established the Arctic Council  as a forum for promoting cooperation, coordination, and interaction among the Arctic states, with the involvement of the Arctic Indigenous communities and other Arctic inhabitants on issues such as sustainable development and environmental protection. The Arctic Council has conducted studies on climate change, oil and gas, and Arctic shipping.

In 2011, the Council member states concluded the Arctic Search and Rescue Agreement, the first binding treaty concluded under the council's auspices.

On March 3, 2022, Canada, Denmark, Finland, Iceland, Norway, Sweden and the United States declared that they will not attend meetings of the Arctic Council under Russian chairmanship because of the Russian invasion of Ukraine. The same countries issued a second statement on June 8, 2022 that declared their intent to resume cooperation on a limited number of previously approved Arctic Council projects that do not involve Russian leadership or participation.

Membership and participation
The council is made up of member and observer states, Indigenous "permanent participants", and observer organizations.

States

Member states
Only states with territory in the Arctic can be members of the council. The member states consist of the following:
 Canada
 Denmark; representing Greenland
 Finland
 Iceland
 Norway
 Russia
 Sweden
 United States

Observer states
Observer status is open to non-Arctic states approved by the Council at the Ministerial Meetings that occur once every two years. Observers have no voting rights in the council. As of September 2021, thirteen non-Arctic states have observer status. Observer states receive invitations for most Council meetings. Their participation in projects and task forces within the working groups is not always possible, but this poses few problems as few observer states want to participate at such a detailed level.

, observer states included:

 Germany, 1998
 Netherlands, 1998
 Poland, 1998
 United Kingdom, 1998
 France, 2000
 Spain, 2006
 China, 2013
 India, 2013
 Italy, 2013
 Japan, 2013
 South Korea, 2013
 Singapore, 2013
 Switzerland, 2017

In 2011, the Council clarified its criteria for admission of observers, most notably including a requirement of applicants to "recognize Arctic States' sovereignty, sovereign rights and jurisdiction in the Arctic" and "recognize that an extensive legal framework applies to the Arctic Ocean including, notably, the Law of the Sea, and that this framework provides a solid foundation for responsible management of this ocean".

Pending observer states
Pending observer states need to request permission for their presence at each individual meeting; such requests are routine and most of them are granted. At the 2013 Ministerial Meeting in Kiruna, Sweden, the European Union (EU) requested full observer status. It was not granted, mostly because the members do not agree with the EU ban on hunting seals.

Pending observer states are:

 European Union
 Turkey

The role of observers was re-evaluated, as were the criteria for admission. As a result, the distinction between permanent and ad hoc observers were dropped.

Indigenous permanent participants
Seven of the eight-member states have sizeable indigenous communities living in their Arctic areas (only Iceland does not have an indigenous community). Organizations of Arctic Indigenous Peoples can obtain the status of Permanent Participant to the Arctic Council, but only if they represent either one indigenous group residing in more than one Arctic State, or two or more Arctic indigenous peoples groups in a single Arctic state. The number of Permanent Participants should at any time be less than the number of members. The category of Permanent Participants has been created to provide for active participation and full consultation with the Arctic indigenous representatives within the Arctic Council. This principle applies to all meetings and activities of the Arctic Council.

Permanent Participants may address the meetings. They may raise points of order that require an immediate decision by the chairman. Agendas of Ministerial Meetings need to be consulted beforehand with them; they may propose supplementary agenda items. When calling the biannual meetings of Senior Arctic Officials, the Permanent Participants must have been consulted beforehand. Finally, Permanent Participants may propose cooperative activities, such as projects. All this makes the position of Arctic indigenous peoples within the Arctic Council quite unique compared to the (often marginal) role of such peoples in other international governmental fora. However, decision-making in the Arctic Council remains in the hands of the eight-member states, on the basis of consensus.

As of 2021, six Arctic indigenous communities have Permanent Participant status. These groups are represented by 
The Aleut International Association (AIA), representing more than 15,000 Aleut in Russia and the United States (Alaska).
The Arctic Athabaskan Council (AAC), representing 45,000 Athabaskan peoples in Canada (Northwest Territories and Yukon) and the United States (Alaska).
The Gwich'in Council International (GCI), representing 9,000 Gwich'in people  in Canada (Northwest Territories and Yukon) and the United States (Alaska).
The Inuit Circumpolar Council (ICC), representing 180,000 Inuit in Canada, Greenland, Russia (Chukotka) and the United States (Alaska).
The Russian Association of Indigenous Peoples of the North (RAIPON), representing 250,000 indigenous peoples of the North, Siberia and the Far East.
The Saami Council, representing more than 100,000 Sámi of Finland, Norway, Russia and Sweden.

However prominent the role of indigenous peoples, the Permanent Participant status does not confer any legal recognition as peoples. The Ottawa Declaration, the Arctic Council's founding document, explicitly states (in a footnote): "The use of the term 'peoples' in this declaration shall not be construed as having any implications as regard the rights which may attach to the term under international law."

The Indigenous Permanent Participants are assisted by the Arctic Council Indigenous Peoples Secretariat.

Observer organizations
Approved intergovernmental organizations and Inter-parliamentary institutions (both global and regional), as well as non-governmental organizations can also obtain Observer Status.

Organizations with observer status currently include the Arctic Parliamentarians, International Union for Conservation of Nature, the International Red Cross Federation, the Nordic Council, the Northern Forum, United Nations Development Programme, United Nations Environment Programme; the Association of World Reindeer Herders, Oceana, the University of the Arctic, and the World Wide Fund for Nature-Arctic Programme.

Administrative aspects

Meetings
The Arctic Council convenes every six months somewhere in the Chair's country for a Senior Arctic Officials (SAO) meeting. SAOs are high-level representatives from the eight-member nations. Sometimes they are ambassadors, but often they are senior foreign ministry officials entrusted with staff-level coordination. Representatives of the six Permanent Participants and the official Observers also are in attendance.

At the end of the two-year cycle, the Chair hosts a Ministerial-level meeting, which is the culmination of the council's work for that period. Most of the eight-member nations are represented by a Minister from their Foreign Affairs, Northern Affairs, or Environment Ministry.

A formal, although non-binding, "Declaration", named for the town in which the meeting is held, sums up the past accomplishments and the future work of the council. These Declarations cover climate change, sustainable development, Arctic monitoring and assessment, persistent organic pollutants and other contaminants, and the work of the council's five Working Groups.

Arctic Council members agreed to action points on protecting the Arctic but most have never materialized.

Chairmanship
Chairmanship of the Council rotates every two years. The current chair is Russia, which serves until the Ministerial meeting in 2023.

Canada (1996–1998)
United States (1998–2000)
Finland (2000–2002)
Iceland (2002–2004)
Russia (2004–2006)
Norway (2006–2009)
Denmark (2009–2011)
Sweden (2011–2013)
Canada (2013–2015)
United States (2015–2017)
Finland (2017–2019)
Iceland (2019–2021)
Russia (2021–2023)

Norway, Denmark, and Sweden have agreed on a set of common priorities for the three chairmanships. They also agreed to a shared secretariat 2006–2013.

The secretariat
Each rotating Chair nation accepts responsibility for maintaining the secretariat, which handles the administrative aspects of the council, including organizing semiannual meetings, hosting the website, and distributing reports and documents. The Norwegian Polar Institute hosted the Arctic Council Secretariat for the six-year period from 2007 to 2013; this was based on an agreement between the three successive Scandinavian Chairs, Norway, Denmark, and Sweden. This temporary Secretariat had a staff of three.

In 2012, the Council moved towards creating a permanent secretariat in Tromsø, Norway.

Past Directors
Magnús Jóhannesson (Iceland) February 2013-October 2017
Nina Buvang Vaaja (Norway) October 2017-August 2021
Mathieu Parker (Canada) August 2021 – Present

The Indigenous Peoples' Secretariat

It is costly for the Permanent participants to be represented at every Council meeting, especially since they take place across the entire circumpolar realm. To enhance the capacity of the PPs to pursue the objectives of the Arctic Council and to assist them to develop their internal capacity to participate and intervene in Council meetings, the Council provides financial support to the Indigenous Peoples' Secretariat (IPS).

The IPS board decides on the allocation of the funds. The IPS was established in 1994 under the Arctic Environmental Protection Strategy (AEPS). It was based in Copenhagen until 2016 when it relocated to Tromsø.

In September 2017, Anna Degteva replaced Elle Merete Omma as the executive secretary for the Indigenous Peoples´ Secretariat.

Working groups, programs and action plans
Arctic Council working groups document Arctic problems and challenges such as sea ice loss, glacier melting, tundra thawing, increase of mercury in food chains, and ocean acidification affecting the entire marine ecosystem.

The six Arctic Council workings groups:
 Arctic Monitoring and Assessment Programme (AMAP)
 Conservation of Arctic Flora & Fauna (CAFF)
 Emergency Prevention, Preparedness & Response (EPPR)
 Protection of the Arctic Marine Environment (PAME)
 Sustainable Development Working Group (SDWG)
 Arctic Contaminants Action Program (ACAP) (since 2006)

Programs and action plans
 Arctic Biodiversity Assessment
 Circumpolar Biodiversity Monitoring Program (CBMP)
 Arctic Climate Impact Assessment
 Arctic Human Development Report

Security and geopolitical issues

Before signing the Ottawa Declaration, a footnote was added stating;  "The Arctic Council should not deal with matters related to military security". In 2019, United States Secretary of State Mike Pompeo stated that circumstances had changed and "the region has become an arena for power and for competition. And the eight Arctic states must adapt to this new future". The council is often in the middle of security and geopolitical issues since the Arctic has peculiar interests to Member States and Observers. Changes in the Arctic environment and participants of the Arctic Council have led to a reconsideration of the relationship between geopolitical matters and the role of the Arctic Council.

Disputes over land and ocean in the Arctic had been extremely limited. The only outstanding land dispute  was between Canada and Denmark over Hans Island, which was resolved in the summer of 2022 with agreement to split the island in half. There are oceanic claims between the United States and Canada in the Beaufort Sea.

The major territorial disputes are over exclusive rights to the seabed under the central Arctic high seas. Due to climate change and melting of the Arctic sea-ice, more energy resources and waterways are now becoming accessible. Large reserves of oil, gas and minerals are located within the Arctic. This environmental factor generated territorial disputes among member states. Canada, Russia, and Denmark (via Greenland) have all submitted partially overlapping claims to the UN Commission on the Limits of the Continental Shelf (CLCS), which is charged with confirming the continental shelf's outer limits. Once the CLCS makes its rulings, Russia, Denmark, and Canada will need to negotiate to divide their overlapping claims.

Disputes also exist over the nature of the Northwest Passage and the Northeast Passage / Northern Sea Route. Canada claims the entire Northwest Passage are Canadian Internal Waters, which means Canada would have total control over which ships may enter the channel. The United States believes the Passage is an international strait, which would mean any ship could transit at any time, and Canada could not close the Passage. Russia's claims over the Northern Sea Route are significantly different. Russia only claims small segments of the Northern Sea Route around straits as internal waters. However, Russia requires all commercial vessels to request and obtain permission to navigate in a large area of the Russian Arctic exclusive economic zone under Article 234 of the UN Convention on the Law of the Sea, which grants coastal states greater powers over ice-covered waters.

Canadian sovereignty over the Northwest Passage arouses substantial public concern in Canada. A poll indicated that half of Canadian respondents said Canada should try to assert its full sovereignty rights over the Beaufort Sea compared to just 10 percent of Americans. New commercial trans-Arctic shipping routes can be another factor of conflicts. A poll found that Canadians perceive the Northwest Passage as their internal Canadian waterway whereas other countries assert it is an international waterway.

The increase in the number of observer states drew attention to other national security issues. Observers have demonstrated their interests in the Arctic region. China has explicitly shown its desire to extract natural resources in Greenland.

Military infrastructure is another point to consider. Canada, Denmark, Norway and Russia are rapidly increasing their defence presence by building up their militaries in the Arctic and developing their building infrastructure.

However, some say that the Arctic Council facilitates stability despite possible conflicts among member states. Norwegian Admiral Haakon Bruun-Hanssen has suggested that the Arctic is "probably the most stable area in the world". They say that laws are well established and followed. Member states think that the sharing cost of the development of Arctic shipping-lanes, research, etc., by cooperation and good relationships between states is beneficial to all.

Looking at these two different perspectives, some suggest that the Arctic Council should expand its role by including peace and security issues as its agenda. A 2010 survey showed that large majorities of respondents in Norway, Canada, Finland, Iceland, and Denmark were very supportive on the issues of an Arctic nuclear-weapons free zone. Although only a small majority of Russian respondents supported such measures, more than 80 percent of them agreed that the Arctic Council should cover peace-building issues. Paul Berkman suggests that solving security matters in the Arctic Council could save members the much larger amount of time required to reach a decision in United Nations. However, as of June 2014, military security matters are often avoided. The focus on science and resource protection and management is seen as a priority, which could be diluted or strained by the discussion of geopolitical security issues.

See also
 Arctic Economic Council
 Arctic cooperation and politics
 Arctic policy of Canada – Arctic Council Chair 2013–2015
 Arctic policy of the United States – Arctic Council Chair 2015–2017
 Antarctic Treaty System
 Ilulissat Declaration
 International Arctic Science Committee
 United Nations Convention on the Law of the Sea

References

Bibliography
 Danita Catherine Burke. 2020. Diplomacy and the Arctic Council. McGill Queen University Press.

External links
 www.arctic-council.org – Arctic Council

Government of the Arctic
Intergovernmental organizations
Arctic